Siranush Harutyunyan (born 7 January 1987), known professionally as Sirusho, is an Armenian singer and songwriter. She received her first award when she was nine years old for her song "Lusabats". Sirusho's first studio album, Sirusho, was released in 2000; followed by the second album Sheram in 2005. In the same year, she was awarded the Future of Armenian Music, Best Album and Best Female Performer awards in the first Armenian National Music Awards.

Sirusho reached international recognition after representing Armenia in the Eurovision Song Contest 2008 with her co-written song "Qélé, Qélé" in Belgrade, Serbia. The song finished fourth in the final and became a hit in Europe. The BBC described her as "national treasure" of Armenia during the contest.

In 2012, Sirusho released the single "PreGomesh", which inspired her to launch a range of handcrafted silver jewelry of the same name, representing Armenian culture and craftsmanship mixed with modern fashion trends. Sirusho is the first Armenian artist to be twice-nominated at World Music Awards with "PreGomesh".

In 2013, W magazine featured Sirusho in their list of "6 un-American idols", with the author saying "the door is still open for Sirusho to introduce the world to a sound and language largely unknown in the West". In 2017, Sirusho was awarded with the title of Honored Artist of Armenia upon the decree of President Serzh Sargsyan. Sirusho's musical style reflects the Armenian traditional sounds mixed with modern music.

Life and career

1987–2004: Early life and career beginnings 
Sirusho was born in Yerevan, Soviet Armenia, on January 7, 1987, to actor and director Hrachya Harutyunyan, and Syuzan Margaryan, one of the most popular singers in Armenia in the 1980s-1990s. Sirusho won her first award as a child at the Armenian National Music Awards for her performance of "Lusabats", an Armenian folk song written in the early 20th century by Komitas. At the age of seven, Sirusho began to write her own music and lyrics in Armenian and English. At the age of nine she won another award at the Young Talents Contest for one of her own compositions. She released her first studio album Sirusho at the age of 13.  Sirusho graduated from Yerevan's Khachik Dashtents School #114 in 2004. She subsequently studied piano at the Sayat-Nova Music School and graduated Yerevan State University with excellence in international relations.

2005–2009: Sheram and Hima 

Although Sirusho mainly performed soul and pop for most of her career, she decided to work on an album of Armenian folk songs by gusan titled Sheram, which was released in 2005. The album also included the single "Shorora", which was very well received. In 2005, Sheram was awarded the Best Album of the Year award at the Armenian National Music Awards. Sirusho also won the "Best Female Artist of the Year" award.

In 2006, Varduhi Vardanyan, a renowned Armenian singer, died. Varduhi has been a close friend of Sirusho's since her childhood. After her death, Sirusho dedicated a song titled "Mez Vochinch Chi Bazhani" ("Nothing Will separate Us"), which is included in Sirusho's album "Hima" ("Now"), to Varduhi.

Also in 2006, Sirusho received the award for Best Female Artist of the Year at the Annual Armenian-Russian Diaspora Music Awards held in Moscow, Russia. A few days later, she released her single "Heranum em" (I am leaving), which soon became a hit. The single was included in Sirusho's album "Hima", which also includes "Arjani E", a track with singer Sofi Mkheyan. The album proved to be a breakthrough in Armenian music, unleashing a fresh wave of mixing soul music and R&B with traditional instruments such as duduk, dhol, and zurna. Sirusho won the "Best Female Artist of the Year" award at the Armenian Music Awards
community at the Kodak Theatre in Hollywood. Sirusho received her fourth Best Female Artist award at the 2008 Armenian national Music Awards.

Sirusho was chosen to represent Armenia in the Eurovision Song Contest 2008. She performed "Qele Qele", which was co-produced by the Canadian Armenian composer DerHova. The song entered the first semi-final on May 20 and advanced to the final which took place on May 24, 2008 in Belgrade. Sirusho took the 4th place with 199 points, and still remains the only Armenian participant who has received the most number of 12 points. During the official after-party following the final, the four winners of the Marcel Bezençon Award 2008 were announced and prizes were given out. They presented a new Fan Award by Swedish website Gylleneskor.se.  Readers of the site had the opportunity to vote online for their favorite 2008 artist. "Qélé, Qélé"  became a hit for Eurovision Song Contest-following fans around the world, especially in Greek-speaking areas. The 'Yerevan Remix' version of the song was regularly played in Greek clubs, on London Greek Radio in the United Kingdom, and in an episode of the Greek and Cyprus X Factor television series.

On April 1, 2009, Sirusho released the song "Erotas"—also known as "Erotas Ksafnikos" (Sudden Love)—an up-tempo dance song with heavy traditional Greek laiko influence sung entirely in Greek. It was composed by singer Hayko and written by Natalia Germanou. Sirusho performed the song live at the Tashir Armenian Awards ceremony in April 2009. Erotas went on to become a number-one hit on the Armenian Singles Chart.

In 2009 Sirusho recorded a song dedicated to peace along with the participants of Eurovision 2008; Boaz Mauda and Jelena Tomasevic, representing Israel and Serbia, respectively.  "Time To Pray" was released in May; its lyrics were written by the President of Israel, Shimon Peres.

2010–2015: Havatum em and "PreGomesh" 
In February 2010, Sirusho performed her new song Havatum em (I Believe) at the Armenian national selection for Eurovision Song Contest 2010. The lyrics and the music are written by Sirusho. At the end of February she was invited to Malta as a special guest to perform at the Maltese Eurovision selection. During the visit she appeared on local television shows and took part in the Maltese annual charity, performing Havatum em.

Sirusho's fourth official studio album, Havatum em, was released in mid-2010 along with new singles. The album includes previously released songs Erotas, the title track, Time to Pray, new songs, and songs she had written for the Armenian national final for Eurovision 2008. During an interview in Malta with esctoday.com, Sirusho was asked whether she would return to the Eurovision Song Contest; she said if people and her fanbase want her to, she will return to represent Armenia again.

In September 2011, the first single from Sirusho's upcoming studio album, "I Like It", was released on iTunes. The video was released on 11 November that year. On December 3, Sirusho was special guest in Junior Eurovision Song Contest 2011 held in Yerevan. She performed DerHova's Yerevan Remix of Qélé, Qélé.

On December 10, 2012, Sirusho unveiled the new single "PreGomesh", a dance track co-written by her and Avet Barseghyan. The song was inspired by an Armenian folk song "Lorva Gutanerg", which was preserved by Komitas. The video is reviving Armenian traditions and presenting them in a modern way. In the same month, Russian singer Grigory Leps released his new album featuring the song “Судьба Зима” written by Sirusho.

Sirusho and Sakis Rouvas announced they were to record and release a duet song "See" in October 2013. In 2014, she was nominated for The Best Armenian Singer, The Best Armenian Song and The Best Armenian Music Video at World Music Awards. Mixing traditions of different generations, Sirusho released the remake of "Tariner" ("Years") with her compatriot Harout Pamboukjian. On November 9 Sirusho's first solo concert took place at Nokia Theater, Los Angeles, U.S.

In 2015 Sirusho released new song "Kga Mi Or" ("Where Were You") dedicated to the 100th anniversary of the Armenian Genocide. The song was released in Armenian and English, and both versions were available on iTunes. She also released a video for the song.

2016–present: Armat
In January 2016, Sirusho released a new single "Mi Togh Indz Menak" (Do released Leave Me Alone) along with its music video. In August 2016 she performed live at Barclaycard Arena in Hamburg, Germany, and was announced as the Best Armenian Female Act at Daf BAMA Music Awards and performed Qele Qele (Remix version). In the same month Sirusho announced the upcoming release of her new album called Armat (Root) that would represent the Armenian culture. In 2017 Sirusho released a new summer hit song "Vuy Aman" together with Armenian-American singer, songwriter, Sebu Simonian of the Capital Cities band. She performed at the opening ceremony of the 2019 CONIFA European Football Cup in the de facto Republic of Artsakh. In 2021, Sirusho released a collaboration single titled "Stay" featuring Norwegian singer Alexander Rybak, who won the 2009 Eurovision Song Contest.

In 2022, Sirusho has participation in the creation of foundation named after Armenian eminent and beloved artist Hayko. The purpose of Hayko Hakobyan foundation is to save and publish Hayko’s musical heritage. In August 2022, Sirusho has participated and sang during the concert dedicated to the  celebration of Hayko's 49th birthday.

Personal life 

On June 6, 2009, Sirusho married Levon Kocharyan, the son of Armenia's second president Robert Kocharyan. Their first son, Robert, was born in 2014. They welcomed their second son, Michael, in May 2016. Their third child, Zabelle, was born in June 2022.

Views and Activism
Sirusho endorsed Robert Kocharyan and the Armenia Alliance party in the 2021 Armenian parliamentary election, and performed on Kocharyan's behalf during his campaign.

She is a supporter of The Republic of Artsakh's independence. During the 2009 Eurovision Song Contest, after the removal of an image of the We Are Our Mountains statue located in the capital city of Stepanakert from Armenia's introductory postcard, she taped a photo of the statue to her clipboard and stood in front of the statue's image while presenting Armenia’s votes. Following the display, The National Security Committee of Azerbaijan seized tele-voting records and interrogated forty-three Azerbaijani citizens that voted for Armenia that year. During the 2020 Nagorno-Karabakh War, she stated on social media that her husband was "in Artsakh" and she would be engaging in volunteer efforts at the border.

She supports global recognition of the Armenian Genocide, a common theme in her work. During a documentary series filmed in 2017, she detailed how she and her crew were forced to leave their recording equipment at the Armenian border and denied permits to film a music video for "Der Zor", a song about the Genocide, in Ani. The music video, as well as documentary footage covering its recording, was done on iPhones, sparking controversy in Turkey.

Discography

Studio albums 
Sirusho (2000)
Sheram (2005)
Hima (2007)
Havatum Em (2010)
Armat (2016)

Singles

Awards and nominations

References

External links

 

1987 births
Eurovision Song Contest entrants for Armenia
Eurovision Song Contest entrants of 2008
Living people
Musicians from Yerevan
Armenian folk-pop singers
21st-century Armenian women singers
Armenian women singer-songwriters
Honored artists of Armenia
Armenian Apostolic Christians